Qlucore is a swedish Bioinformatics software company founded in early 2007. It started as a collaborative research project at Lund University, Sweden, supported by researchers at the Departments of Mathematics and Clinical Genetics. The objective was to address the vast amount of high-dimensional data generated with microarray gene expression analysis. As a result, it was recognized that an interactive scientific software tool was needed to conceptualize the ideas evolving from the research collaboration.

Since then, a new version of the software has been released approximately every nine months. In 2017, Qlucore took a major step in technology by adding the NGS module including a dynamic and fast Genome browser to enable analysis of data being generated with Next Generation Sequencing (NGS) technologies. Qlucore Omics Explorer is a visualization-based software program that provides exploration and visualization of big data. It enables researchers to analyze and explore large data sets (containing up to more than 100 million data samples) on a regular PC or Mac. Qlucore Omics Explorer customers are mainly from the Life Science, Plant, Food and Biotech industries and from matching academic research areas.

Precision and companion diagnostics is going to have a fundamental impact on healthcare and in 2020 one more major step was taken by adding a new product line with Qlucore Diagnostics and Qlucore Insights. AI-powered, disease-specific, machine learning-based classifier models are combined with patient-friendly visualizations in an easy to use and cost-effective software solution that integrates with a wide range of data-generating techniques and instruments. It is shaped for the future of precision oncology and will enable the clinics to implement the latest cancer detection & analysis models. Qlucore Insights is for research use only and work is ongoing (2022) to receive regulatory approval (CE) for Qlucore Diagnostics.

In the fall of 2021 Qlucore was listed on NASDAQ First North.

References

 BBC: Read about how Qlucore Omics Explorer is used at King's College in London to analyze gene expression data from worms. http://news.bbc.co.uk/2/hi/technology/8386807.stm
 SP2 Magazine: Read about how Qlucore solution enables new working models for biologists and statisticians. Page 33 and onwards. http://www.labnews.co.uk/laboratory_article.php/4795/5/getting-through-the-data-maze

External links
Qlucore website
Qlucore references

Bioinformatics software